The Ministry of Justice of the Republic of the Congo (Congo Brazzaville) manages the court system and is composed of the following:

 The cabinet
 The departments attached to the firm
 The general inspection of the courts and services related to the judicial body
 The General Secretariat for Justice
 The general directorates

List of ministers (Mainly post-1960 upon achieving independence) 
Pascal Okiemba-Morlende (1963-1964)
François Luc Macosso (1965-1968)
 Aloyse Moudileno-Massengo (1968–1972)
 Alexandre Denguet (1972–1975)
 Antoine Kaine (1975)
Pierre Ngaka (1976–1977)
Alphonse Mouissou-Poaty (1977–1978)
Andre Mouelle (1979)
Victor Tamba-Tamba (1979–1980)
Dieudonne Kimbembe (1981–1989)
Alphonse Nzoungou (1989–1991)
Jean Martin M'Bemba (1992)
Jean Francois Tchibinda Kouangou (1993–1995)
Joseph Ouabari (1995–1997)
Pierre Nze (1997–1999)
Jean Martin M'Bemba (1999–2007)
 Aimé Emmanuel Yoka (2007–2016) [referred to as the Minister of State, Minister of Justice, Minister of Justice and Human Rights]
 Pierre Mabiala (2016–present)

See also 

 Justice ministry
Garde des Sceaux, ministre de la Justice (république du Congo) [Minister of Justice, Minister of Justice (Republic of the Congo)]
 Republic of the Congo

References 

Justice ministries
Government of the Republic of the Congo